Eino Alex Soinio (né Salin, 12 November 1894 – 7 December 1973) was a Finnish association football player. Together with his elder brother Kaarlo he was part of the Finnish team that placed fourth in the 1912 Summer Olympics. He played all four matches and scored one goal. In total he played 40 times for Finland between 1912 and 1927.

References

External links

1894 births
1973 deaths
Finnish footballers
Finland international footballers
Helsingin Jalkapalloklubi players
Footballers at the 1912 Summer Olympics
Olympic footballers of Finland
Association football midfielders
Footballers from Helsinki